The 4th Rivers State House of Assembly was in session from 29 May 1999 until 29 May 2003. All members of the House were elected on 9 January 1999. The majority party was the Rivers State People's Democratic Party led by Marshal Harry. The presiding officer (Speaker) of the Assembly was Chibuike Amaechi.

Members

References

Rivers State House of Assembly
1999 establishments in Nigeria
1990s establishments in Rivers State
2003 disestablishments in Nigeria
2000s disestablishments in Rivers State